The Federal University of Pampa (Unipampa) is a public university established in 2006 in the Southern region of the state of Rio Grande do Sul.

Unipampa was created by Law 11640 of January 11, 2008 as the Federal University of Pampa, with headquarters in the city of Bagé, in Rio Grande do Sul.

Unipampa has campuses in Alegrete, Bagé, Caçapava do Sul, Dom Pedrito, Itaqui, Jaguarão, Santana do Livramento, São Borja, São Gabriel and Uruguaiana.

The first exams for the Vestibular Unipampa occurred on December 17 and June 18, 2006. The first class was in September 2006. Entering Unipampa from 2010 was through ENEM SISU.

The first academic master's Unipampa was the Graduate Program in Electrical Engineering in the Alegrete campus recommended by CAPES in 2009 and activities started in August 2010.

Paleontology
São Gabriel campus performs paleontological research, in the Geopark of Paleorrota. The research has been made between the São Gabriel city to the Bagé city  and belong to the Permian period.

Campus website
 Alegrete campus
 Bagé campus
 Caçapava do Sul campus
 Dom Pedrito campus
 Itaqui campus
 Jaguarão campus
 Santana do Livramento campus
 São Borja campus
 São Gabriel campus
 Uruguaiana campus

Undergraduate courses
Alegrete Campus
 Computer Science
 Civil Engineering
 Electrical Engineering
 Mechanical Engineering
 Software Engineering
 Agricultural Engineering
 Master in Electrical Engineering

Bagé Campus
 Production Engineering
 Food Engineering 
 Chemical Engineering
 Computer Engineering
 Energy Engineering
 Degree in Physics 
 BSc Chemistry 
 Degree in Mathematics
 Bachelor of Arts - Portuguese and Spanish
 Bachelor of Arts - English and Portuguese

Caçapava do Sul Campus
 Center for Science and Technology'' 
 Bachelor of Geophysics 
 BS in Geology
 Degree in Mathematical Sciences - Physics, Chemistry and Mathematics 
 Degree in Mining Technology

Dom Pedrito Campus
 Center for Agricultural Sciences: 
 Animal Science 
 Degree in Technology in Agribusiness

Itaqui Campus
 Center for Agricultural Sciences:
 Agronomy 
 Science and Technology Agrifood
 Nutrition

Jaguarão Campus
 Center for the Humanities:
 Education
 Bachelor of Arts - Portuguese and Spanish
 Degree in History 
 Technology in Tourism

Santana do Livramento Campus
 Center for the Humanities:
 Business Administration
 Degree in Technology Management in Public
 International Relations 
 Economics

São Borja Campus
 Center for Social Sciences:
 Media: Journalism 
 Media: Advertising
 Media: Public Relations
 Social Welfare 
 Political Science

São Gabriel Campus
 Center of Rural Sciences:
 Biological Sciences - Bachelor
 Biological Sciences - full degree
 Forestry - Environmental Management
 Biotechnology

Uruguaiana Campus
 Center for Health Sciences:
 Natural Sciences 
 Nursing 
 Pharmacy 
 Physiotherapy
 Veterinary Medicine
 Degree and Bachelor of Physical Education
 Degree in Technology in Aquaculture

Graduate courses
 Master 's Degree in Electrical Engineering
 Expertise in Technology in Mathematics Teaching
 Specialization in Literature and Language 
 Specialization in Policies and Intervention in Intra-Family Violence
 Master 's Degree Biochemistry

See also
Brazil University Rankings
Pampa Region
Universities and Higher Education in Brazil

References

External links

 

Educational institutions established in 2006
2006 establishments in Brazil
Universities and colleges in Rio Grande do Sul
Federal universities of Brazil